Placer, officially the Municipality of Placer,  is a 2nd class municipality in the province of Masbate, Philippines. According to the 2020 census, it has a population of 56,340 people.

By virtue of Republic Act No. 292, passed on June 16, 1948, the barrio of Placer was constituted as its own municipality, separate from Cataingan. At the time of its creation, Placer included the entire present-day municipality of Esperanza, which was then a barrio of Placer (its largest barrio). It is one of the only four municipalities in Masbate which is dominantly Cebuano-speaking, the other being the adjacent municipalities of Esperanza; Esperanza separated from Placer in 1959., Pio V. Corpuz, and Cawayan.

Geography

Barangays
Placer is politically subdivided into 35 barangays.

Climate

Demographics

Economy

References

External links
 [ Philippine Standard Geographic Code]
Philippine Census Information
Local Governance Performance Management System

Municipalities of Masbate